Conceição do Coité is a municipality in the state of Bahia in the North-East region of Brazil. The women there are known for wearing large curlers in their hair.

See also
List of municipalities in Bahia

References

Municipalities in Bahia